Eimantas Stanionis (born 17 August 1994) is a Lithuanian professional boxer who has held the WBA (Regular) welterweight title since April 2022. As an amateur, he won a gold medal at the 2015 European Championships in the welterweight bracket.

Professional career
After defeating Liu Wei in his first match in the welterweight division of the 2016 Summer Olympics he lost a 3-0 decision to eventual silver medalist (and 2017 World Amateur Champion) Shakhram Giyasov of Uzbekistan. 

Stanionis made his professional debut on April 9, 2017, against Rasheed Olawale Lawal. He won the fight by a first-round knockout. Stanionis notched three more victories in 2017, stopping Isaac Freeman on July 30, Oscar Valenzuela on September 23, and winning a unanimous decision against Todd Manuel on October 14.

Stanionis began 2018 with a fourth-round technical knockout of Hector Munoz on March 10, 2018. He followed this up with a third-round technical knockout of Erick Daniel Martinez on June 16, and by winning a unanimous decision against Levan Ghvamichava on August 24.

Stanionis fought thrice in 2019. He first won a unanimous decision against Samuel Figueroa on March 9, 2019, which was followed by stoppage victories over Evincii Dixon on October 26, and Julio Cesar Sanchez on December 21.

Stanionis was scheduled to face on November 4, 2020. He won the fight by a ninth-round knockout, which was preceded by two knockdowns in the same round. Stanionis was next scheduled to fight Janer Gonzalez just one month later, on December 16, 2020. He won the fight by a ninth-round knockout, with two of the three judges also awarding him all eight preceding rounds.

Stanionis was scheduled to face the one-time WBO light welterweight title challenger Thomas Dulorme on April 10, 2021, in his first twelve-round bout. He won the fight by unanimous decision, with scores of 117-111, 116-112 and 115-113. Stanionis faced the former WBA welterweight titlist Luis Collazo on August 7, 2021. The fight ended in a no-contest, following an accidental clash of heads which caused a cut in Collazo’s right eyelid.

Professional boxing record

See also
List of world welterweight boxing champions

References

External links 
 
 
 
 
 
 

1994 births
Living people
Lithuanian male boxers
Olympic boxers of Lithuania
Boxers at the 2016 Summer Olympics
Welterweight boxers
World welterweight boxing champions
World Boxing Association champions